Guarapo or guarapa (Portuguese: garapa) may refer to:

Sugarcane juice
For the palm-tree sap also known as guarapo, see Miel de palma
Guarapo (drink) a fermented alcoholic drink in Latin American cuisine
Guarapo, a 1989 film of Juan Luis Galiardo
Garapa (film), a 2009 film by José Padilha